Moritz Abraham Stern (29 June 1807 – 30 January 1894) was a German mathematician. Stern became Ordinarius (full professor) at Göttingen University in 1858, succeeding Carl Friedrich Gauss. Stern was the first Jewish full professor at a German university who attained the position without changing his Jewish religion. Although Carl Gustav Jacobi preceded him (by three decades) as the first Jew to obtain a math professorial chair in Germany, Jacobi's family had converted to Christianity long before then.

As a professor, Stern taught Gauss's student Bernhard Riemann. Stern was very helpful to Gotthold Eisenstein in formulating a proof of the quadratic reciprocity theorem. Stern was interested in primes that cannot be expressed as the sum of a prime and twice a square (now known as Stern primes).

He is known for formulating Stern's diatomic series
1, 1, 2, 1, 3, 2, 3, 1, 4, … 
that counts the number of ways to write a number as a sum of powers of two with no power used more than twice.

He is also known for the Stern–Brocot tree, which he wrote about in 1858 and which Brocot independently discovered in 1861.

References

External links 
 
 

1807 births
1894 deaths
19th-century German Jews
19th-century German mathematicians
Academic staff of the University of Göttingen